"The Royale" is the twelfth episode of the second season of the American science fiction television series Star Trek: The Next Generation, the 38th episode overall. It was originally released on March 27, 1989, in broadcast syndication.

Set in the 24th century, the series follows the adventures of the Starfleet crew of the Federation starship Enterprise-D. In this episode, Riker, Data, and Worf become trapped in a strange hotel on a planet otherwise incapable of supporting human life.

Plot 
Following a tip from a Klingon ship, the Federation starship Enterprise, under the command of Captain Jean-Luc Picard, finds debris from an Earth ship orbiting an uninhabitable alien planet. A sample of the debris beamed aboard shows NASA markings and a 52-star American flag, dating the ship to the mid-to-late 21st century and establishing that it had traveled far beyond the capability of ships of that era.  Scans of the planet reveal a small anomalous area capable of supporting human life, so Commander Riker, Lt. Worf, and Lt. Commander Data beam down to investigate, and find a revolving door standing alone in a dark void. Upon entering, they find themselves in an old Earth-style hotel and casino called The Royale, where they are cut off from contact with the Enterprise.

The away team soon discovers they are trapped inside the casino, and after making several unsuccessful attempts to leave, they decide to explore the building. In a hotel room, they find the desiccated but preserved remains of Col. Stephen Richey, a NASA astronaut, and a pulp novel entitled Hotel Royale. Upon reading Richey's diary, they learn that his starship had launched in 2037, been accidentally contaminated by an unknown alien race, then transported through a wormhole across the galaxy; he was the only survivor. Taking pity on him, the aliens created The Royale for him, thinking the novel's story represented humans' preferred way of living, whereas Richey found it unbearable thanks to the poor quality of the novel. He lived there for 38 years until his death, and his remains have been in the room for 283 years.

Riker, Data, and Worf realize that the plot has been recreated in detail by the aliens and is playing out around them, and surmise that they might be able to leave if the story dictates that they do so. They assume the role of a trio of foreign investors described in the novel, who eventually leave the hotel after buying it for $12.5 million. Data begins to play craps, using his winnings from an earlier visit to the blackjack table, but soon senses that the dice are loaded to favor the house. He compresses them in his hand to readjust their weight distribution in his favor, then goes on a winning streak that breaks the bank and wins over $24 million. The three Starfleet officers then announce themselves as the foreign investors and buy the hotel with their winnings, give the rest of the money away to the staff and other gamblers, and depart as stated in the novel. After they return to the Enterprise, Riker and Picard speculate on the alien contamination of Richey's ship and how it could have ended up so far from Earth. Picard muses that the entire incident is a puzzle they may never be able to solve, similar to Fermat's Last Theorem.

Production 
The episode was written by Tracy Tormé under the pseudonym of Keith Mills.  Tormé had his name removed from the credits after he became unsatisfied with rewrites. His original idea was a surreal nightmare about an astronaut stuck forever in his most pleasant memory.

Historical/scientific accuracy 
 The episode mentions Fermat's Last Theorem, and that it still had not been solved after 800 years. A proof was, however, found by Andrew Wiles and published in 1995, six years after the episode aired. The resulting incongruity in "The Royale" was later addressed in the Star Trek: Deep Space Nine episode "Facets".
 In the scene where Chief Engineer Geordi La Forge scans the planet, he describes the surface temperature as −291 °C, a temperature that is below absolute zero (−273.15 °C).  
 In the scene where Lt. Commander Data observes a couple playing blackjack, he advises a woman that "the odds favor standing pat" on her total of hard thirteen against a dealer's king up; the optimal play is to take a card.

Reception 
Zack Handlen of The A.V. Club rated it B and wrote that the episode is "watchable" but  does not live up to his memories. 
Keith R. A. DeCandido of Tor.com rated the episode 5 out of 10.

In 2019, Screen Rant ranked "The Royale" the funniest episode of Star Trek: The Next Generation.

See also
 It was a dark and stormy night, referenced by the first line of the "Hotel Royale" novel.

References

 Star Trek The Next Generation DVD set, volume 2, disc 3, selection 4.

External links

 

Star Trek: The Next Generation (season 2) episodes
1989 American television episodes
Television episodes about gambling
Works about astronauts
Television episodes directed by Cliff Bole